Deçan Bistrica is a river in Kosovo. It is a 53 km-long right tributary of the White Drin River, passing the western part of Kosovo.

Name 

The river's name, Lumbardh, literally translates to White River in Albanian. The adjective, i Deçanit, differentiates it from the other Lumbardh tributaries of the White Drin in the Dukagjini area. The other name, Bistrica, means "clearwater" in Serbian. Like the official name, the adjective Dečanska, "of Dečani", is added to distinguish it from other Bistrica rivers in the Dukagjini region: Peja's Lumbardh ("of Peć"), Prizren's Lumbardh ("of Prizren"), Baba Loc's Lumbardh ("of Baba Loc/Kožnjar"), Lloqan's Lumbardh ("of Loćane"), etc.

Geography

Bjeshkët e Nemuna and Gorge of Deçan 

Deçan's Lumbardh originates from the southern slopes of the Bogiçevica mountain, a part of the massive Bjeshkët e Nemuna mountain system. The river flows north of the Gjeravica peak, the highest in Kosovo (2,656 m), initially under the name of Lumi Shqiptar, and receives many streams from the Bogiçevica, Micinat, Strečoka and Kopranik mountains. The river turns southeast on the northern slopes of the Kopranik and Strečoka mountains, where it carved the deep gorge of Deçan (Gryka e Deçanit). The upper part of the gorge is the glacial trough of the ancient Deçan glacier on the Bjeshkët e Nemuna, or Accursed Mountains.

Dukagjini region 

As the river flows out of the gorge it reaches the medieval monastery of Visoki Dečani, which is on UNESCO's World Heritage List. The river continues eastward, in the very densely populated area next to the small town of Deçan and the villages of Isniq, Beleg, Jabllanicë, Këpuz, Kotradiq, Kralan, Lluka e Epërme, Lumbardh, Nepolë, Papiq and Vranoc, before it empties into the White Drin. In the upper course, the waters of the river are used for the Kožnjar hydroelectrical power plant (6.5 MW). In the lower parts its waters are, to some extent, used for irrigation. The Lumbardhi i Deçanit belongs to the Adriatic Sea drainage basin, drains itself an area of 300 km2, and it is not navigable.

Notes

References

Bibliography 

 Mala Prosvetina Enciklopedija, Third edition (1985); Prosveta; 
 Jovan Đ. Marković (1990): Enciklopedijski geografski leksikon Jugoslavije; Svjetlost-Sarajevo; 

Rivers of Kosovo
Accursed Mountains